Pete Eemeli Parkkonen (born 8 February 1990) is a Finnish singer singing in both Finnish and English. He took part in the Finnish Idol competition in its fourth season finishing third. After Idol he launched a solo career releasing albums The First Album in 2009 that topped the Finnish Albums Chart followed by I'm an Accident in 2010.

Career
In Idol
Parkkosen auditioned with "Mies jolle ei koskaan tapahdu mitään", a song by J. Karjalainen. during the competition, he interpreted various songs, most notably "Queen City" and "I Kissed a Girl". In the semi-finals, he sang songs from Foo Fighters, Danko Jones and Eppu Normaali making it to the Final 3.  The season finals were held on 9 November 2009 with Parkkonen considered the favourite to win. However, he was unexpectedly eliminated in the Final 3 phase finishing third. The grand finale was held on 14 December with Koop Arponen winning the title and Anna Puustjärvi as runner-up.

After Idol
After Idol, Parkkonen received a recording contract from Sony BMG and was the first season 4 contestants to release an album. Appropriately titled The First Album, he debuted at number 1 in its first week of release. The album went on to sell just over 24,000 copies and was accredited a gold award. Parkkonen's second studio album, I'm an Accident was released on 18 February 2010, but failed to gain the same commercial success peaking at number 21.

He is preparing a third album in 2014 in Finnish language. Preliminary single releases from the prospective album include "Mitä minä sanoin" and "Mun".

In popular culture 
Parkkonen has also taken part in a number of reality television shows including season 2 of Livenä vieraissa (2009) where he sang "Womanizer" from Britney Spears and "Girl In A Uniform" his single. He also took part in Kuorosota, the Finnish version of Clash of the Choirs and broadcast on Nelonen station coming second and donating 20,000 Euros to charity.

Discography
Albums

Singles

Other songs (in local charts)
2009: "The Final Day"
2009: "Minute Is a Lifetime"
2010: "I'm an Accident"
2010: "In Too Deep"
2013: "Mitä minä sanoin"
2014: "Mun"

Featured in

Personal life 
Parkkonen was born into a musical family, and his brother  is also a singer. His paternal grandfather was Pierre Rassin, a black French musician from Martinique, who met Parkkonen's paternal grandmother in Äänekoski in 1953 when he worked for the traveling carnival . Parkkonen has spoken openly about the childhood bullying he had experienced because of his dark skin color that he inherited from his father, Kari.

Parkkonen has a son (born in 2015) with singer Johanna von Hertzen, a second cousin of the Von Hertzen Brothers.

References

External links
 

1990 births
Living people
21st-century Finnish male singers
Finnish rock singers
Finnish pop singers
Finnish LGBT singers
People from Pihtipudas
Idols (franchise) participants
Warner Music Group artists
English-language singers from Finland
Finnish people of Martiniquais descent